Erich Marx (born 3 June 1906, date of death unknown) was a German cross-country skier. He competed in the men's 50 kilometre event at the 1936 Winter Olympics.

References

1906 births
Year of death missing
German male cross-country skiers
Olympic cross-country skiers of Germany
Cross-country skiers at the 1936 Winter Olympics
Place of birth missing